The Electoral district of Ripon, Hampden, Grenville and Polwarth was one of the original sixteen electoral districts of the old unicameral Victorian Legislative Council of 1851 to 1856. Victoria being a colony in Australia at the time.

The district's area was defined as consisting of the four central western Victorian counties of Ripon, Hampden, Grenville and Polwarth.

From 1856 onwards, the Victorian parliament consisted of two houses, the Victorian Legislative Council (upper house, consisting of Provinces) and the Victorian Legislative Assembly (lower house).

Members
One member initially, two from the enlarged Council of 1853.

 = resigned
 = by-election

Campbell went on to represent Polwarth, Ripon, Hampden and South Grenville in the Victorian Legislative Assembly from November 1856.

See also
 Parliaments of the Australian states and territories
 List of members of the Victorian Legislative Council

References

)

Former electoral districts of Victorian Legislative Council
1851 establishments in Australia
1856 disestablishments in Australia